Nina Škottová (6 October 1946, in Prostějov – 28 April 2018, in Bedihošť) was a Czech politician and Member of the European Parliament with the Civic Democratic Party, part of the European Democrats and sat on the European Parliament's Committee on Budgets.

She was a substitute for the Committee on Culture and Education and a member of the
Delegation for relations with Switzerland, Iceland and Norway and to the European Economic Area (EEA) Joint Parliamentary Committee.

Education
 1973: Doctor of Natural Sciences (Faculty of Pharmacy, Comenius University, Bratislava)
 1979: holder of the postgraduate qualification 'Candidate of Sciences' (Faculty of Pharmacy, Comenius University, Bratislava)
 1990: Senior lecturer (Faculty of Medicine, Palacký University of Olomouc)

Career
 1972–1982: Research fellow
 1982–1990: Specialised assistant professor
 since 1990: Senior lecturer
 1999–2004: Head of the Institute of Pharmacology
 1998–2000: Vice-Chairwoman of the Prostějov area local association of ODS (Civic Democratic Party)
 since 2000: Member of the Prostějov area local association of ODS

See also
2004 European Parliament election in the Czech Republic

External links
 
 

1946 births
2018 deaths
Politicians from Prostějov
Civic Democratic Party (Czech Republic) MEPs
MEPs for the Czech Republic 2004–2009
Women MEPs for the Czech Republic
Academic staff of Palacký University Olomouc